Super Genius may refer to:

 an imprint of Papercutz (publisher)
 Super Genius (album), by Circus Lupus, 1992
 Super Genius Games, a publisher of role-playing games

See also
Wile E. Coyote